Beryozka is a rural locality in Novoposelenovsky Selsoviet Rural Settlement, Kursky District, Kursk Oblast, Russia. Population:

Geography 
The village is located 78 km from the Russia–Ukraine border, 17 km south-west of Kursk, 6.5 km from the selsoviet center – 1st Tsvetovo.

 Climate
Beryozka has a warm-summer humid continental climate (Dfb in the Köppen climate classification).

Transport 
Beryozka is located 3 km from the federal route  Crimea Highway (a part of the European route ), on the road of intermunicipal significance  ("Crimea Highway" – Beryozka), 9 km from the nearest railway halt 457 km (railway line Lgov I — Kursk).

The rural locality is situated 23.5 km from Kursk Vostochny Airport, 107 km from Belgorod International Airport and 216 km from Voronezh Peter the Great Airport.

References

Notes

Sources

Rural localities in Kursky District, Kursk Oblast